Light of God may refer to:

Divine light, a religious concept
Inward light, a Quaker religious concept
Nūr (Islam), an Islamic religious concept

See also
Divine light (disambiguation)
Dominus illuminatio mea, a Latin motto meaning "The Lord is my light"
Neri (given name), a name of obscure origin biblically meaning "light of God"
Nurullah, an Arabic name meaning "light of God"
Uriel, meaning "light of God" per the Book of Enoch